One Woman Man is an album by American country music artist George Jones, released on February 28, 1989 on Epic Records.

Recording
One Woman Man spawned one hit single, a cover of the 1950s Johnny Horton song "(I'm A) One Woman Man", which peaked at No. 5 in March 1989. None of the other singles penetrated the top 25, although "The King Is Gone (So Are You)" would become a big fan favorite; originally titled "Ya Ba Da Ba Doo (So Are You)," the song is about a man who, in a drunken stupor after using a Flintstones jelly bean jar to drink whiskey from a "Jim Beam decanter that looks like Elvis", believes Elvis Presley and Fred Flintstone are his drinking buddies.  Written by Roger D. Ferris, the novelty was perfect for Jones, who also performed it at live shows as a way to poke gentle fun at his past excesses.  The song's publisher changed the title to avoid a legal entanglement; early pressings of the LP contain its original title.

One Woman Man garnered more critical claim than any other Jones LP in years but in reality it was a hodgepodge collection of new material, previously released tracks and a couple of unreleased cuts fished out of the vaults and dusted off with fresh vocals.  "Burning Bridges" and the murder ballad "Radio Lover", for example, had already appeared on the 1983 album Jones Country. The album includes a re-recording of Hank Locklin's "Don't You Ever Get Tired (Of Hurting Me)", a song Jones had initially covered on his 1965 album, Mr. Country and Western Music.  Also included is a cover of The Louvin Brothers' "My Baby's Gone".  The dismal failure of the album's other singles following "(I'm A) One Woman Man" was largely the result of veteran country stars losing favor with country radio as the format was altered radically as the nineties dawned, a turn of events that left Jones appalled.  "I shouldn't have to beg for radio play," the singer groused a few years later in a November 1992 interview with People.  "It disgusts the hell out of me to see the way country has changed.  There's just too much money involved now."

Reception
One Woman Man received positive reviews and rose to No. 13 on the Billboard country albums chart.  Brian Mansfield of AllMusic calls it "One of Jones' best Epic albums."  In his book George Jones: The Life and Times of a Honky Tonk Legend, biographer Bob Allen writes that Jones "seemed to briefly rediscover the old honky-tonk fervor he'd misplaced in middle age.  The entire LP...was firmly anchored in the honky-tonk spirit."

Track listing

Chart performance

Weekly charts

Year-end charts

References

1989 albums
George Jones albums
Epic Records albums
Albums produced by Billy Sherrill